In biology, cell signaling (cell signalling in British English) or cell communication is the ability of a cell to receive, process, and transmit signals with its environment and with itself. Cell signaling is a fundamental property of all cellular life in prokaryotes and eukaryotes. Signals that originate from outside a cell (or extracellular signals) can be physical agents like mechanical pressure,  voltage, temperature, light, or chemical signals (e.g., small molecules, peptides, or gas). Cell signaling can occur over short or long distances, and as a result can be classified as autocrine, juxtacrine, intracrine, paracrine, or endocrine. Signaling molecules can be synthesized from various biosynthetic pathways and released through  passive or active transports, or even from cell damage. 

Receptors play a key role in cell signaling as they are able to detect chemical signals or physical stimuli. Receptors are generally proteins located on the cell surface or within the interior of the cell such as the cytoplasm, organelles, and  nucleus. Cell surface receptors usually bind with extracellular signals (or  ligands), which causes a conformational change in the receptor that leads it to initiate  enzymic activity, or to open or close ion channel activity. Some receptors do not contain enzymatic or channel-like  domains but are instead linked to enzymes or  transporters. Other receptors like nuclear receptors have a different mechanism such as changing their DNA binding properties and cellular localization to the nucleus.

Signal transduction begins with the transformation (or transduction) of a signal into a chemical one, which can directly activate an ion channel (ligand-gated ion channel) or initiate a second messenger system cascade that propagates the signal through the cell. Second messenger systems can amplify a signal, in which activation of a few receptors results in multiple secondary messengers being activated, thereby amplifying the initial signal (the first messenger).

Each cell is programmed to respond to specific extracellular signal molecules, and is the basis of development, tissue repair,  immunity, and homeostasis. Errors in signaling interactions may cause diseases such as cancer, autoimmunity, and diabetes.

Taxonomic range 

In many small organisms such as bacteria, quorum sensing enables individuals to begin an activity only when the population is sufficiently large. This signaling between cells was first observed in the marine bacterium Aliivibrio fischeri, which produces light when the population is dense enough. The mechanism involves the production and detection of a signaling molecule, and the regulation of gene transcription in response. Quorum sensing operates in both gram-positive and gram-negative bacteria, and both within and between species.

In slime moulds, individual cells aggregate together to form fruiting bodies and eventually spores, under the influence of a chemical signal, known as an acrasin. The individuals move by chemotaxis, i.e. they are attracted by the chemical gradient. Some species use cyclic AMP as the signal; others such as Polysphondylium violaceum use a dipeptide known as glorin.

In plants and animals, signaling between cells occurs either through release into the extracellular space, divided in paracrine signaling (over short distances) and endocrine signaling (over long distances), or by direct contact, known as juxtacrine signaling such as notch signaling. Autocrine signaling is a special case of paracrine signaling where the secreting cell has the ability to respond to the secreted signaling molecule. Synaptic signaling is a special case of paracrine signaling (for chemical synapses) or juxtacrine signaling (for electrical synapses) between neurons and target cells.

Extracellular signal

Synthesis and release

Many cell signals are carried by molecules that are released by one cell and move to make contact with another cell. Signaling molecules can belong to several chemical classes: lipids, phospholipids, amino acids, monoamines, proteins, glycoproteins, or gases. Signaling molecules binding surface receptors are generally large and hydrophilic (e.g. TRH, Vasopressin, Acetylcholine), while those entering the cell are generally small and hydrophobic (e.g. glucocorticoids, thyroid hormones, cholecalciferol, retinoic acid), but important exceptions to both are numerous, and the same molecule can act both via surface receptors or in an intracrine manner to different effects. In animal cells, specialized cells release these hormones and send them through the circulatory system to other parts of the body. They then reach target cells, which can recognize and respond to the hormones and produce a result. This is also known as endocrine signaling. Plant growth regulators, or plant hormones, move through cells or by diffusing through the air as a gas to reach their targets. Hydrogen sulfide is produced in small amounts by some cells of the human body and has a number of biological signaling functions. Only two other such gases are currently known to act as signaling molecules in the human body: nitric oxide and carbon monoxide.

Exocytosis

Exocytosis is the process by which a cell transports molecules such as neurotransmitters and proteins out of the cell. As an active transport mechanism, exocytosis requires the use of energy to transport material. Exocytosis and its counterpart, endocytosis, the process that brings substances into the cell, are used by all cells because most chemical substances important to them are large polar molecules that cannot pass through the hydrophobic portion of the cell membrane by passive transport. Exocytosis is the process by which a large amount of molecules are released; thus it is a form of bulk transport. Exocytosis occurs via secretory portals at the cell plasma membrane called porosomes. Porosomes are permanent cup-shaped lipoprotein structures at the cell plasma membrane, where secretory vesicles transiently dock and fuse to release intra-vesicular contents from the cell.

In exocytosis, membrane-bound secretory vesicles are carried to the cell membrane, where they dock and fuse at porosomes and their contents (i.e., water-soluble molecules) are secreted into the extracellular environment. This secretion is possible because the vesicle transiently fuses with the plasma membrane. In the context of neurotransmission, neurotransmitters are typically released from synaptic vesicles into the synaptic cleft via exocytosis; however, neurotransmitters can also be released via reverse transport through membrane transport proteins.

Forms

Autocrine

Autocrine signaling involves a cell secreting a hormone or chemical messenger (called the autocrine agent) that binds to autocrine receptors on that same cell, leading to changes in the cell itself. This can be contrasted with paracrine signaling, intracrine signaling, or classical endocrine signaling.

Paracrine
In paracrine signaling, a cell produces a signal to induce changes in nearby cells, altering the behaviour of those cells. Signaling molecules known as paracrine factors diffuse over a relatively short distance (local action), as opposed to cell signaling by endocrine factors, hormones which travel considerably longer distances via the circulatory system; juxtacrine interactions; and autocrine signaling. Cells that produce paracrine factors secrete them into the immediate extracellular environment. Factors then travel to nearby cells in which the gradient of factor received determines the outcome. However, the exact distance that paracrine factors can travel is not certain.

Paracrine signals such as retinoic acid target only cells in the vicinity of the emitting cell. Neurotransmitters represent another example of a paracrine signal. 

Some signaling molecules can function as both a hormone and a neurotransmitter. For example, epinephrine and norepinephrine can function as hormones when released from the adrenal gland and are transported to the heart by way of the blood stream. Norepinephrine can also be produced by neurons to function as a neurotransmitter within the brain. Estrogen can be released by the ovary and function as a hormone or act locally via paracrine or autocrine signaling.

Although paracrine signaling elicits a diverse array of responses in the induced cells, most paracrine factors utilize a relatively streamlined set of receptors and pathways. In fact, different organs in the body - even between different species - are known to utilize a similar sets of paracrine factors in differential development. The highly conserved receptors and pathways can be organized into four major families based on similar structures:  fibroblast growth factor (FGF) family, Hedgehog family, Wnt family, and TGF-β superfamily. Binding of a paracrine factor to its respective receptor initiates signal transduction cascades, eliciting different responses.

Endocrine
Endocrine signals are called hormones. Hormones are produced by endocrine cells and they travel through the blood to reach all parts of the body. Specificity of signaling can be controlled if only some cells can respond to a particular hormone. Endocrine signaling involves the release of hormones by internal glands of an organism directly into the circulatory system, regulating distant target organs. In vertebrates, the hypothalamus is the neural control center for all endocrine systems. In humans, the major endocrine glands are the thyroid gland and the adrenal glands. The study of the endocrine system and its disorders is known as endocrinology.

Juxtacrine
Juxtacrine signaling is a type of cell–cell or cell–extracellular matrix signaling in multicellular organisms that requires close contact. There are three types:

 A membrane ligand (protein, oligosaccharide, lipid) and a membrane protein of two adjacent cells interact.
 A communicating junction links the intracellular compartments of two adjacent cells, allowing transit of relatively small molecules.
 An extracellular matrix glycoprotein and a membrane protein interact.

Additionally, in unicellular organisms such as bacteria, juxtacrine signaling means interactions by membrane contact. Juxtacrine signaling has been observed for some growth factors, cytokine and chemokine cellular signals, playing an important role in the immune response. Juxtacrine signalling via direct membrane contacts is also present between neuronal cell bodies and motile processes of microglia both during development, and in the adult brain.

Receptors
 

Cells receive information from their neighbors through a class of proteins known as receptors. Receptors may bind with some molecules (ligands) or may interact with physical agents like light, mechanical temperature, pressure, etc. Reception occurs when the target cell (any cell with a receptor protein specific to the signal molecule) detects a signal, usually in the form of a small, water-soluble molecule, via binding to a receptor protein on the cell surface, or once inside the cell, the signaling molecule can bind to intracellular receptors, other elements, or stimulate enzyme activity (e.g. gasses), as in intracrine signaling. 

Signaling molecules interact with a target cell as a ligand to cell surface receptors, and/or by entering into the cell through its membrane or endocytosis for intracrine signaling. This generally results in the activation of second messengers, leading to various physiological effects. In many mammals, early embryo cells exchange signals with cells of the uterus. In the human gastrointestinal tract, bacteria exchange signals with each other and with human epithelial and immune system cells. For the yeast Saccharomyces cerevisiae during mating, some cells send a peptide signal (mating factor pheromones) into their environment. The mating factor peptide may bind to a cell surface receptor on other yeast cells and induce them to prepare for mating.

Cell surface receptors

Cell surface receptors play an essential role in the biological systems of single- and multi-cellular organisms and malfunction or damage to these proteins is associated with cancer, heart disease, and asthma. These trans-membrane receptors are able to transmit information from outside the cell to the inside because they change conformation when a specific ligand binds to it. There are three major types:  Ion channel linked receptors,  G protein–coupled receptors, and enzyme-linked receptors.

Ion channel linked receptors

Ion channel linked receptors are a group of transmembrane ion-channel proteins which open to allow ions such as Na+, K+, Ca2+, and/or Cl− to pass through the membrane in response to the binding of a chemical messenger (i.e. a ligand), such as a neurotransmitter.

When a presynaptic neuron is excited, it releases a neurotransmitter from vesicles into the synaptic cleft. The neurotransmitter then binds to receptors located on the postsynaptic neuron. If these receptors are ligand-gated ion channels, a resulting conformational change opens the ion channels, which leads to a flow of ions across the cell membrane. This, in turn, results in either a depolarization, for an excitatory receptor response, or a hyperpolarization, for an inhibitory response.

These receptor proteins are typically composed of at least two different domains: a transmembrane domain which includes the ion pore, and an extracellular domain which includes the ligand binding location (an allosteric binding site). This modularity has enabled a 'divide and conquer' approach to finding the structure of the proteins (crystallising each domain separately). The function of such receptors located at synapses is to convert the chemical signal of presynaptically released neurotransmitter directly and very quickly into a postsynaptic electrical signal. Many LICs are additionally modulated by allosteric ligands, by channel blockers, ions, or the membrane potential. LICs are classified into three superfamilies which lack evolutionary relationship: cys-loop receptors, ionotropic glutamate receptors and ATP-gated channels.

G protein–coupled receptors

G protein-coupled receptors are a large group of evolutionarily-related proteins that are cell surface receptors that detect molecules outside the cell and activate cellular responses. Coupling with G proteins, they are called seven-transmembrane receptors because they pass through the cell membrane seven times. They  are  all  activated  by  agonists although a spontaneous auto-activation of an empty receptor can also be observed. 

G protein-coupled receptors are found only in eukaryotes, including yeast, choanoflagellates, and animals. The ligands that bind and activate these receptors include light-sensitive compounds, odors, pheromones, hormones, and neurotransmitters, and vary in size from small molecules to peptides to large proteins. G protein-coupled receptors are involved in many diseases.

There are two principal signal transduction pathways involving the G protein-coupled receptors: cAMP signal pathway and phosphatidylinositol signal pathway. When a ligand binds to the GPCR it causes a conformational change in the GPCR, which allows it to act as a guanine nucleotide exchange factor (GEF). The GPCR can then activate an associated G protein by exchanging the GDP bound to the G protein for a GTP. The G protein's α subunit, together with the bound GTP, can then dissociate from the β and γ subunits to further affect intracellular signaling proteins or target functional proteins directly depending on the α subunit type (Gαs, Gαi/o, Gαq/11, Gα12/13).

G protein-coupled receptors are an important drug target and approximately 34% of all Food and Drug Administration (FDA) approved drugs target 108 members of this family.  The global sales volume for these drugs is estimated to be 180 billion US dollars . It is estimated that GPCRs are targets for about 50% of drugs currently on the market, mainly due to their involvement in signaling pathways related to many diseases i.e. mental, metabolic including endocrinological disorders, immunological including viral infections, cardiovascular, inflammatory, senses disorders, and cancer. The long ago discovered association between GPCRs and many endogenous and exogenous substances, resulting in e.g. analgesia, is another dynamically developing field of pharmaceutical research.

Enzyme-linked receptors

Enzyme-linked receptors (or catalytic receptors) are transmembrane receptors that, upon activation by an extracellular ligand, causes enzymatic activity on the intracellular side. Hence a catalytic receptor is an integral membrane protein possessing both enzymatic, catalytic, and receptor functions.

They have two important domains, an extra-cellular ligand binding domain and an intracellular domain, which has a catalytic function; and a single transmembrane helix.  The signaling molecule binds to the receptor on the outside of the cell and causes a conformational change on the catalytic function located on the receptor inside the cell. Examples of the enzymatic activity include:
 Receptor tyrosine kinase, as in fibroblast growth factor receptor. Most enzyme-linked receptors are of this type.
 Serine/threonine-specific protein kinase, as in bone morphogenetic protein
 Guanylate cyclase, as in atrial natriuretic factor receptor

Intracellular receptors

Steroid hormone receptor

Steroid hormone receptors are found in the nucleus, cytosol, and also on the plasma membrane of target cells. They are generally intracellular receptors (typically cytoplasmic or nuclear) and initiate signal transduction for steroid hormones which lead to changes in gene expression over a time period of hours to days. The best studied steroid hormone receptors are members of the nuclear receptor subfamily 3 (NR3) that include receptors for estrogen (group NR3A) and 3-ketosteroids (group NR3C).  In addition to nuclear receptors, several G protein-coupled receptors and ion channels act as cell surface receptors for certain steroid hormones.

Signal transduction pathways

When binding to the signaling molecule, the receptor protein changes in some way and starts the process of transduction, which can occur in a single step or as a series of changes in a sequence of different molecules (called a signal transduction pathway). The molecules that compose these pathways are known as relay molecules. The multistep process of the transduction stage is often composed of the activation of proteins by addition or removal of phosphate groups or even the release of other small molecules or ions that can act as messengers. The amplifying of a signal is one of the benefits to this multiple step sequence. Other benefits include more opportunities for regulation than simpler systems do and the fine-tuning of the response, in both unicellular and multicellular organism.

In some cases, receptor activation caused by ligand binding to a receptor is directly coupled to the cell's response to the ligand. For example, the neurotransmitter GABA can activate a cell surface receptor that is part of an ion channel. GABA binding to a GABAA receptor on a neuron opens a chloride-selective ion channel that is part of the receptor. GABAA receptor activation allows negatively charged chloride ions to move into the neuron, which inhibits the ability of the neuron to produce action potentials. However, for many cell surface receptors, ligand-receptor interactions are not directly linked to the cell's response. The activated receptor must first interact with other proteins inside the cell before the ultimate physiological effect of the ligand on the cell's behavior is produced. Often, the behavior of a chain of several interacting cell proteins is altered following receptor activation. The entire set of cell changes induced by receptor activation is called a signal transduction mechanism or pathway.

A more complex signal transduction pathway is the MAPK/ERK pathway, which involves changes of protein–protein interactions inside the cell, induced by an external signal. Many growth factors bind to receptors at the cell surface and stimulate cells to progress through the cell cycle and divide. Several of these receptors are kinases that start to phosphorylate themselves and other proteins when binding to a ligand. This phosphorylation can generate a binding site for a different protein and thus induce protein–protein interaction. In this case, the ligand (called epidermal growth factor, or EGF) binds to the receptor (called EGFR). This activates the receptor to phosphorylate itself. The phosphorylated receptor binds to an adaptor protein (GRB2), which couples the signal to further downstream signaling processes. For example, one of the signal transduction pathways that are activated is called the mitogen-activated protein kinase (MAPK) pathway. The signal transduction component labeled as "MAPK" in the pathway was originally called "ERK," so the pathway is called the MAPK/ERK pathway. The MAPK protein is an enzyme, a protein kinase that can attach phosphate to target proteins such as the transcription factor MYC and, thus, alter gene transcription and, ultimately, cell cycle progression. Many cellular proteins are activated downstream of the growth factor receptors (such as EGFR) that initiate this signal transduction pathway.

Some signaling transduction pathways respond differently, depending on the amount of signaling received by the cell. For instance, the hedgehog protein activates different genes, depending on the amount of hedgehog protein present.

Complex multi-component signal transduction pathways provide opportunities for feedback, signal amplification, and interactions inside one cell between multiple signals and signaling pathways.

A specific cellular response is the result of the transduced signal in the final stage of cell signaling. This response can essentially be any cellular activity that is present in a body. It can spur the rearrangement of the cytoskeleton, or even as catalysis by an enzyme. These three steps of cell signaling all ensure that the right cells are behaving as told, at the right time, and in synchronization with other cells and their own functions within the organism. At the end, the end of a signal pathway leads to the regulation of a cellular activity. This response can take place in the nucleus or in the cytoplasm of the cell. A majority of signaling pathways control protein synthesis by turning certain genes on and off in the nucleus.

In unicellular organisms such as bacteria, signaling can be used to 'activate' peers from a dormant state, enhance virulence, defend against bacteriophages, etc. In quorum sensing, which is also found in social insects, the multiplicity of individual signals has the potentiality to create a positive feedback loop, generating coordinated response.  In this context, the signaling molecules are called autoinducers. This signaling mechanism may have been involved in evolution from unicellular to multicellular organisms. Bacteria also use contact-dependent signaling, notably to limit their growth.

Signaling molecules used by multicellular organisms are often called pheromones. They can have such purposes as alerting against danger, indicating food supply, or assisting in reproduction.

Short-term cellular responses
.

Regulating gene activity

.

Notch signaling pathway

Notch is a cell surface protein that functions as a receptor. Animals have a small set of genes that code for signaling proteins that interact specifically with Notch receptors and stimulate a response in cells that express Notch on their surface. Molecules that activate (or, in some cases, inhibit) receptors can be classified as hormones, neurotransmitters, cytokines, and growth factors, in general called receptor ligands. Ligand receptor interactions such as that of the Notch receptor interaction, are known to be the main interactions responsible for cell signaling mechanisms and communication. notch acts as a receptor for ligands that are expressed on adjacent cells. While some receptors are cell-surface proteins, others are found inside cells. For example, estrogen is a hydrophobic molecule that can pass through the lipid bilayer of the membranes. As part of the endocrine system, intracellular estrogen receptors from a variety of cell types can be activated by estrogen produced in the ovaries.

In the case of Notch-mediated signaling, the signal transduction mechanism can be relatively simple. As shown in Figure 2, the activation of Notch can cause the Notch protein to be altered by a protease. Part of the Notch protein is released from the cell surface membrane and takes part in gene regulation. Cell signaling research involves studying the spatial and temporal dynamics of both receptors and the components of signaling pathways that are activated by receptors in various cell types. Emerging methods for single-cell mass-spectrometry analysis promise to enable studying signal transduction with single-cell resolution.

In notch signaling, direct contact between cells allows for precise control of cell differentiation during embryonic development. In the worm Caenorhabditis elegans, two cells of the developing gonad each have an equal chance of terminally differentiating or becoming a uterine precursor cell that continues to divide. The choice of which cell continues to divide is controlled by competition of cell surface signals. One cell will happen to produce more of a cell surface protein that activates the Notch receptor on the adjacent cell. This activates a feedback loop or system that reduces Notch expression in the cell that will differentiate and that increases Notch on the surface of the cell that continues as a stem cell.

See also 

Scaffold protein
Biosemiotics
Molecular cellular cognition
Crosstalk (biology)
Bacterial outer membrane vesicles
Membrane vesicle trafficking
Host-pathogen interface
Retinoic acid
JAK-STAT signaling pathway
Imd pathway
Localisation signal
Oscillation
Protein dynamics
Systems biology
Lipid signaling
Redox signaling
Signaling cascade
Cell Signaling Technology, an antibody development and production company
Netpath – A curated resource of signal transduction pathways in humans
Synthetic Biology Open Language
Nanoscale networking – leveraging biological signaling to construct ad hoc in vivo communication networks
Soliton model in neuroscience—Physical communication via sound waves in membranes
Temporal feedback

References

Further reading 

 "The Inside Story of Cell Communication". learn.genetics.utah.edu. Retrieved 2018-10-20.
"When Cell Communication Goes Wrong". learn.genetics.utah.edu. Retrieved 2018-10-24.

External links 
NCI-Nature Pathway Interaction Database: authoritative information about signaling pathways in human cells.
 
 
Signaling Pathways Project: cell signaling hypothesis generation knowledgebase constructed using biocurated archived transcriptomic and ChIP-Seq datasets

 
Cell biology
Cell communication
Systems biology
Human female endocrine system